The following is a list of events affecting Canadian television in 1980. Events listed include television show debuts, finales, cancellations, and channel launches.

Events

Debuts

Ending this year

Television shows

1950s
Country Canada (1954–2007)
CBC News Magazine (1952–1981)
The Friendly Giant (1958–1985)
Hockey Night in Canada (1952–present)
The National (1954–present)
Front Page Challenge (1957–1995)
Wayne and Shuster Show (1958–1989)

1960s
CTV National News (1961–present)
Land and Sea (1964–present)
Man Alive (1967–2000)
Mr. Dressup (1967–1996)
The Nature of Things (1960–present, scientific documentary series)
Question Period (1967–present, news program)
Reach for the Top (1961–1985)
Take 30 (1962–1983)
The Tommy Hunter Show (1965–1992)
University of the Air (1966–1983)
W-FIVE (1966–present, newsmagazine program)

1970s
The Beachcombers (1972–1990)
Canada AM (1972–present, news program)
Celebrity Cooks (1975–1984)
City Lights (1973–1989)
Definition (1974–1989)
the fifth estate (1975–present, newsmagazine program)
Flappers (1979–1981)
Grand Old Country (1975–1981)
The Great Detective (1979–1982)
Headline Hunters (1972–1983)
Let's Go (1976–1984)
The Littlest Hobo (1979–1985)Live It Up! (1978–1990)The Mad Dash (1978–1985)Marketplace (1972–present, newsmagazine program)Read All About It! (1979–1983)Second City Television (1976–1984)Smith & Smith (1979–1985)This Land (1970–1982)You Can't Do That on Television (1979–1990)V.I.P. (1973–1983)The Watson Report (1975–1981)100 Huntley Street (1977–present, religious program)

TV moviesHarvestLyon's DenMaintain the RightA Population of OneA Question of the SixthWar BridesThe Winnings of Frankie Walls''

Television stations

Debuts

See also
 1980 in Canada
 List of Canadian films of 1980

References